Away Goes Prudence is a 1920 American silent comedy film produced by Famous Players-Lasky and distributed by Paramount Pictures. This picture was directed by John S. Robertson and starred Billie Burke. Screenwriter Josephine Lovett provided a story direct for the screen. This is now considered a lost film.

Cast
Billie Burke as Prudence Thorne
Percy Marmont as Hewitt Harland
Maude Turner Gordon as Aunt Prudence Thorne
Charles Lane as Mr. Thorne 
Dorothy Walters as Mrs. Ryan 
Bradley Barker as Michael Ryan
M. W. Rale as Chinaman
Albert Hackett as Jimmie Ryan

References

External links

Still from the set with Billie Burke and Albert Hackett (on right) from the University of Washington, Sayre Collection
lobby cards formed to create one poster

1920 films
Films directed by John S. Robertson
American black-and-white films
Lost American films
American silent feature films
Famous Players-Lasky films
1920 comedy films
Silent American comedy films
1920 lost films
Lost comedy films
1920s American films